Robert Alexy (born 9 September 1945 in Oldenburg, Germany) is a jurist and a legal philosopher.

Alexy studied law and philosophy at the University of Göttingen. He received his J.D. in 1976 with the dissertation A Theory of Legal Argumentation, and he achieved his Habilitation in 1984 with a Theory of Constitutional Rights.

He is a professor at the University of Kiel and in 2002 he was appointed to the Academy of Sciences and Humanities at the University of Göttingen. In 2010 he was awarded the Order of Merit of the Federal Republic of Germany.

Since 2008 the Universities of Alicante, Buenos Aires, Tucumán, Antwerp, National University of San Marcos in Lima, Prague, Coimbra, Porto Alegre, Belo Horizonte, Chapecó, Rio de Janeiro and Bogotá awarded him the honorary doctorate degree.

Natural law theory 

Alexy's definition of law looks like a mix of Kelsen's normativism (which was an influential version of legal positivism) and Radbruch's legal naturalism (Alexy, 2002), but Alexy's theory of argumentation (Alexy, 1983) puts him very close to legal interpretivism.

In The Argument From Injustice, Alexy defends Radbruch's formula that injust or evil laws only lose their legal validity when they deliberately disavow justice and equality. He formulated law's relationship to morality on three theses:

 The thesis of incorporation; each legal system contains principles.
 The moral thesis; law must be related to a common moral.
 The correctness thesis; law must be related to a just moral.

At the heart of his theory is the claim to correctness: Law must necessarily claim to be correct, no matter how corrupt, lest it be self-contradictory and fundamentally illogical. As law coerces behaviour and gives individuals decisive reasons for acting, the correctness it claims must also be moral.

Publications 

Theorie der juristischen Argumentation. Die Theorie des rationalen Diskurses als Theorie der juristischen Begründung (Suhrkamp, 1983; first edition 1978)
Translated by Neil MacCormick as "A Theory of Legal Argumentation: The Theory of Rational Discourse as Theory of Legal Justification" (Clarendon, 1989)
Theorie der Grundrechte (Suhrkamp, 1985; second edition 1994)
Translated by Julian Rivers as "A Theory of Constitutional Rights" (Oxford University Press, 2002)
Mauerschützen (Vandenhoeck + Ruprecht, 1993)
Recht, Vernunft, Diskurs (Suhrkamp, 1995)
Der Beschluß des Bundesverfassungsgerichts zu den Tötungen an der innerdeutschen Grenze vom 24. Oktober 1996 (Vandenhoeck & Ruprecht, 1997)
Begriff und Geltung des Rechts (Verlag Karl Alber, 1992)
Translated by Stanley Paulson and Bonnie Litschewski Paulson as "The Argument from Injustice: A Reply to Legal Positivism" (Oxford University Press, 2002)
Elemente einer juristischen Begründungslehre, co-edited with Hans-Joachim Koch, Lothar Kuhlen and Helmut Rüßmann (Nomos, 2003)

Further reading
George Pavlakos (ed), Law, Rights and Discourse: The Legal Philosophy of Robert Alexy (Hart Publishing, 2007)
Matthias Klatt (ed), Institutionalized Reason: The Jurisprudence of Robert Alexy (Oxford University Press, 2012)

References

1945 births
Living people
20th-century German philosophers
Philosophers of law
Jurists from Lower Saxony
Officers Crosses of the Order of Merit of the Federal Republic of Germany
German male writers
People from Oldenburg (city)
Members of the Göttingen Academy of Sciences and Humanities